Craig Steven Virgin (born August 2, 1955) is an American distance runner. He was born in Belleville, Illinois and grew up near Lebanon, Illinois. While in high school, Virgin won 5 state championships (two in cross country and three in track) as well as setting the national outdoor high school 2-mile record of 8:40.9 (beating Steve Prefontaine's mark of 8:41.5, though slightly short of Gerry Lindgren's 8:40.0 indoor record from 1964). Additionally, Virgin held the Illinois Boys Cross Country all-time state championship record for 47 years, running a 13:50.6 in 1972, a record that stood until November 9, 2019 when Josh Methner of John Hersey High School ran a 13:49.86.  Virgin was Track and Field News "High School Athlete of the Year" in 1973.

Running career
While attending the University of Illinois, he won nine Big Ten Conference championships, nine All American awards as well as the 1975 NCAA Cross Country championship. He was a three-time Olympic qualifier at 10,000 meters, and the only American male to qualify three times in the event until Galen Rupp (2008, 2012, 2016). He was a seven-time American record holder in road and track events, including a 27:39.4 in the 10,000 meters in 1979 (breaking Prefontaine's American record) and a 27:29.16 in 1980 that was the second fastest 10,000 meters in history at the time.

Virgin enjoyed success in cross country, road racing, and track. He was the winner of the 1979 Falmouth Road Race in a course record 32:20, was the two-time winner (1980 & 1981) of the 12 km Bay to Breakers race in San Francisco, was a three-time winner of the 10K Peachtree Road Race (1979–1981) in Atlanta, and twice ran the fastest American 10 km road efforts (on point to point courses) with a 28:06 2nd place at the 1981 Crescent City Classic in New Orleans and later a 28:04 win at Peachtree that year. He enjoyed success in the few marathons he ran, his fastest time coming in a 2nd-place finish in the 1981 Boston Marathon (2:10:26). On the track he was a three-time national champion in the 10,000 meters at the U.S. National Track & Field Championships (1978, 1979, and 1982) and the winner of the 1980 Olympic Trials 10,000 meters. In cross country he was a nine-time member of the U.S. squad at the World Cross Country Championships.  His biggest international accomplishment was being the first (and still the only) American man to win the IAAF World Cross Country Championships; which he did twice, in 1980 and 1981. He retired from competitive racing in 1992. In 2001, he was inducted into the National Distance Running Hall of Fame, and in 2011 inducted into the St. Louis Sports Hall of Fame. Also in 2011, he was inducted into the National USA Track & Field Hall of Fame, after being selected in 2010. Virgin deferred his induction for one year so he could be inducted at the USATF General Meeting that was held in St. Louis in 2011. Most recently in 2020, inducted into the National High School Track & Field Hall of Fame. During his professional career he ran for the Saint Louis Track Club.

Olympic success eluded Virgin. He was eliminated in the 10,000-metre heats at both the 1976 Montreal Summer Olympics and the 1984 Los Angeles Summer Olympics (see, for example, Matti Hannus, ed., "Montreal Olympic Book" / Montreal Olympiakirja, Helsinki:  "Runner" / Juoksija magazine, 1976;  "The Big Olympic Book" / Suuri Olympiateos, volume 4, published in Finland in 1984). In 1980, ten days before the Olympics began, he ran the second fastest 10,000 meter race in history, but due to the U.S. boycott was not allowed to participate in the games. He did receive one of 461 Congressional Gold Medals created especially for the spurned athletes.

Competition record

Cross Country

Track and field - US Olympic Trials

Marathon

US National Championships

NCAA cross country

Personal bests

Post-athletic career
In 1992, Virgin was the Democratic candidate for a seat in the Illinois Senate against incumbent Republican Senator Frank Watson. Watson was victorious.

After the 2019 Chicago Public Schools Strike, Virgin came out against the Illinois High School Association's decision to bar runners from Chicago Public Schools from competing at the 2019 state championship.

See also
 World Fit

References
Hall of Fame
RRCA American Long Distance Running Hall of Fame 1984
National Distance Running Hall of Fame 2001
National USA Track & Field Hall of Fame 2011
St. Louis Sports Hall of Fame 2011
University of Illinois Athletics Hall of Fame 2017
National High School Track & Field Hall of Fame 2020
General
Official website
http://www.activeness.WOAGnet/2006/03/going-distance-catching-up-with-craig.html
History Repeats Itself...Records are made to be broken, just ask Craig Virgin
http://www.garycohenrunning.com/Interviews/Virgin.aspx
Specific

External links 
 Official site
 
 
 
 

1955 births
Living people
People from Belleville, Illinois
Sportspeople from Illinois
American male long-distance runners
American male marathon runners
Olympic track and field athletes of the United States
Athletes (track and field) at the 1976 Summer Olympics
Congressional Gold Medal recipients
Athletes (track and field) at the 1984 Summer Olympics
World Athletics Cross Country Championships winners
Illinois Fighting Illini men's track and field athletes
People from Lebanon, Illinois
Illinois Fighting Illini men's cross country runners